In mathematics, especially the field of group theory, the Parker vector is an integer vector that describes a permutation group in terms of the cycle structure of its elements.

Definition
The Parker vector P of a permutation group G acting on a set of size n, is the vector whose kth component for k = 1, ..., n is given by:
 where ck(g) is the number of k-cycles in the cycle decomposition of g.

Applications
The Parker vector can assist in the recognition of Galois groups.

References

Permutation groups